Skuibakken is a  large hill at Bærum   in Akershus county, Norway.

Skuibakken was developed with a  ski slope which opened in 1928. It is owned by Bærums Skiklub. The first major rebuilding began in the autumn of 1938. By the end of the 1950s, it was considered to build a modern ski slope. Today's facilities are largely the result of renovations in 1962-63 and partly in the early 1970s. It hosted two FIS Ski jumping World Cup events in 1981 and 1983. Former ski jumper  Paal Hansen holds the ski slope record  from 1996.

World Cup

References

Ski jumping venues in Norway
Sport in Norway